Qeshlaq-e Tak Quyi Qarah Piran (also Romanized as Qeshlāq-e Tak Qūyī Qarah Pīrān) is a village in Qeshlaq-e Gharbi Rural District, Aslan Duz District, Parsabad County, Ardabil Province, Iran. At the 2006 census, its population was 87, in 14 families.

References 

Towns and villages in Parsabad County